Durgon is an unincorporated community in Hardy County, West Virginia, United States. It is located on US 220/WV 28/WV 55 at the routes' junction with County Route 220/5, west of Moorefield along the South Branch Potomac River.

References 

Unincorporated communities in Hardy County, West Virginia
Populated places on the South Branch Potomac River
Unincorporated communities in West Virginia